Janice Rebibo (née Silverman; January 31, 1950 – March 11, 2015) was an American-born Israeli poet who began writing in Hebrew in the mid-1980s.

Biography
Janice Silverman Rebibo was born in Boston, Massachusetts and studied at Boston Hebrew College. She later immigrated to Israel. Rebibo died of cancer, aged 65. She is survived by her father, Henry Silverman, and by her two children.

Literary career
Rebibo began writing in Hebrew while studying Hebrew language and literature at Hebrew College. Dozens of her poems appeared in Israel's major newspapers and journals. An anthology of Israeli writers of English included several of her poems and the journal, Iton 77, featured her Hebrew poem, Etzb'a Elohim (God's finger).

Janice Silverman Rebibo's first collection of poetry in English, My Beautiful Ballooning Heart, was published in July, 2013. How Many Edens, Rebibo's most recent poetry chapbook, was published in April 2014 

Using allusions, humor and eroticism, much of Rebibo's poetry shows how relationships are shaped by language, culture, religion, and politics. Her first Hebrew poems appeared in 1984 in the literary supplement of the Hebrew language newspaper Davar on the recommendation of Israeli poet Haim Gouri.<ref>Ben, Menahem, Hebrew review of Targilei Hisur ("Subtraction"), "Zman Tel Aviv", Maariv, November 30, 2000.</ref> Her poems and short stories appeared frequently in Israel's literary pages and journals  and her four books of Hebrew poetry have been published. Zara in Zion: Collected Poems 1984-2006 by Janice Rebibo, published in 2007, includes Hebrew poetry from her three earlier books and new work previously published in Israel's literary journals, as well as a chapter entitled Zion by Itself containing poems Rebibo has written in English. 
Rebibo translated Hebrew poetry into English, notably for poet Natan Yonatan. Her poems have been set to music and recorded. Hazman Ozel (time is running out), music by Gidi Koren, was released in 2009 by NMC on a live performance DVD by The Brothers and The Sisters. She collaborated with composers on texts and librettos. Here Comes Messiah!, a monodrama for soprano and chamber orchestra by Matti Kovler, libretto by Janice Silverman Rebibo and Matti Kovler, was premiered at Carnegie Hall with soprano, Tehila Nini Goldstein, on May 9, 2009.

Rebibo edited and translated prose for novelist Yizhar Smilansky, Toronto filmmaker Avi Lev,Profile, wearesamba.com; accessed March 17, 2015. Prof Moshe Bar-Asher at the Academy of the Hebrew Language, and others. Rebibo directed an innovative school-pairing program to promote tolerance, friendship, and cooperation in Israeli society and serves as SPO at a non-profit for the advancement of Hebrew language teaching and learning in North America. 

Published works
The first of her four poetry collections, Zara (a stranger-woman, referring to the figure in Proverbs), was published in 1997. She later served as chief translator for Natan Yonatan, completing Within the Song to Live, his bilingual volume of selected work, following that popular poet’s death in 2004.Zara Betzion: shirim 1984-2006, a blend of two literary traditions, received a President of Israel Award and other prizes. Her poems have been set to music by composer, Gidi Koren. In addition to the English libretto for composer Matti Kovler's The Escape of Jonah, Rebibo also collaborated with Kovler to write the libretto for Here Comes Messiah!, performed at Carnegie Hall in 2009 and at Boston's Jordan Hall in 2010.

Literary style
Rebibo's poetry has been described as having “a new strength and the kind of courage that comprises a strategic breakthrough, a stance of both audacity and humor that adds something new to the war of independence of Israel's consciousness – a revolution of language, spirit and mind”, according to critic Menahem Ben.

Awards and recognitionZara Betzion'' ("A Stranger in Zion") by Janice Rebibo received awards from the Office of the President of Israel and the Mifal HaPayis Cultural Committee, as well as Hebrew College's Steiner Prize in Hebrew Literature, one of several academic and literary prizes awarded to Rebibo over her many years of association with that College.

See also
Hebrew literature

References

External links
 Open Library - Hebrew books by Janice Rebibo Listing including translations to English Book in English: My Beautiful Ballooning Heart, poems by Janice Silverman Rebibo, 2013
 "Janice ג'ניס" - English and Hebrew poetry and events blog
 Janice Rebibo in Ohio State University's Modern Hebrew Literature Lexicon
 Rebibo's Jerusalem Post piece dedicated to Natan Yonatan on the first anniversary of his passing
 Zara Betzion booklaunch, Tel Aviv, December 1, 2007 
 Hebrew poems by Janice Rebibo online 
  More Hebrew poems by Janice Rebibo online
 My Beautiful Ballooning Heart, Muddy River Poetry Review

1950 births
2015 deaths
Hebrew-language poets
Writers from Boston
Israeli women poets
Israeli poets
Israeli people of American-Jewish descent
American people of Israeli descent
Deaths from cancer in Israel
Place of death missing
20th-century poets
20th-century American women writers
American women poets
Israeli translators
20th-century American translators
Jewish women writers
American emigrants to Israel
21st-century American women